Fairfield High School (FHS) is located just south of Leesburg, Ohio.  It is the only high school in the Fairfield Local School District.

Athletics
The school's mascot for the boys teams is the Lion and their official colors are red and white. The girls' teams are the Lady Lions. Their athletic teams belong to the Ohio High School Athletic Association and the Southern Hills Athletic League.

Notes and references

External links
 District website
 School website

High schools in Highland County, Ohio
Public high schools in Ohio